The Alien Conspiracy is the debut and only studio album by Crisis n.T.i., released in 1995 by Synthetic Symphony and Cyber-Tec Records. The album was reissued by Fifth Colvmn Records on October 17, 1995.

Reception 
Sonic Boom praised Gentons artistic growth as a composer, saying "add a grittier focused edge to the music, a concise theme used throughout the album, and the logical progression from Cyber-Tec to Crisis N.T.I. is obvious."

Track listing

Personnel 
Adapted from The Alien Conspiracy liner notes.

Crisis n.T.i.
 Ged Denton – instruments

Additional performers
 Kevin Gould – instruments
 Richard McKinlay – instruments

Production and design
 Stef Michalski (Room237) – cover art, illustrations, design
 Zalman Fishman – executive-production

Release history

References

External links
 

1995 debut albums
Fifth Colvmn Records albums